__notoc__

"The Rhetoric of Drugs" in the original French title, is a 1990 work by French philosopher Jacques Derrida. Derrida, interviewed, discusses the concept of "drug", and says that "Already one must conclude that the concept of drug is a non-scientific concept, that it is instituted on the basis of moral or political evaluations." In his philosophical-linguistic analysis, Derrida unmasks the socio-cultural mystifications made on the discourses on drugs.

Derrida also discusses drugs use by athletes. Exploring its confines, he says: "and what about women athletes who get pregnant for the stimulating, hormonal effects and then have an abortion after their event?"

Derrida discusses how the link between the rhetoric of drugs and the Western ideology. He also says that "Adorno and Horkheimer correctly point out that drug culture has always been associated with the West's other, with Oriental ethics and religion", and adds: "The Enlightenment [...] is in itself a declaration of war on drugs."

Editions
This interview was made in 1989 and published more than one time as a journal article. It was included in the Derrida's 1992 book Points de suspension. Entretiens, as section XIV. The English edition of Points de suspension. Entretiens, titled Points: Interviews 1974-1994 (1995), contained the interview at pp. 228–254, as the final part of the chapter Autobiophotographies.
"The Rhetoric of Drugs. an Interview" – journal article by Jacques Derrida; Differences, Vol. 5, 1993
"The Rhetoric of Drugs", translated by Michael Israel; published in Points: Interviews 1974-1994 (1995)

See also
Prohibition (drugs)
Recreational drug use
Hard and soft drugs
Arguments for and against drug prohibition
Cognitive liberty

Notes

References
English edition, 1995
Theodor W. Adorno and Max Horkheimer [1944]. Dialectic of Enlightenment (French translation by E. Kaufholz, Gallimard, 1974)
Ma la droga non e' solo una parola, article published by Corriere della Sera, March 1993. Quotes from Montalcini: "the quibbles of a philosopher!" accuses Rita Levi Montalcini, which was the protagonist, with Di Pietro and Archbishop Martini, of last anti-drug publicity campaign. [...] Rita Levi Montalcini turns up her nose, bothered:  "it seems to me that this gentleman ( 'questo signore', an Italian mildly derogative expression ) amuses himself quibbling, in order to appear original. Those that we call drugs ( "stupefacenti", an Italian word that sounds somewhat more 'official' ) are substances that are well identified both on the pharmacological-botanical level and on the behavioural level. You can mythologize them as much as you want, but it has been proven, that they are not at all, means to reach an higher knowledge. On the contrary, they decrease cognitive ability and increase emotional responses. Neither Newton nor Einstein made their discoveries under the action of any drug".

Political science books
Philosophy books
1989 non-fiction books
Pharmaceuticals policy
Non-fiction books about drugs
Philosophy essays
Works by Jacques Derrida
Works originally published in French magazines
Books of interviews